KF Fushë Kosova (Klubi Futbollistik Fushë Kosova) is a football club based in Kosovo Polje, Kosovo. The club has played in the second division of football in Kosovo, First Football League of Kosovo, during the 2005–06 season. However, they won promotion to the top tier of football in Kosovo, the Football Superleague of Kosovo, for the 2006–07 season.

Honours 
 Kosovo Province League (pre-1991)
Champions: 1973, 1991

First Football League of Kosovo
Runners-up (2): 2005–06, 2012–13

Current squad

External links 
Official Liga e Parë Table by Kosovo Football Federation

Fushë Kosova
Kosovo Polje
Fushe Kosova